Charles Priestley "Peggy" Flournoy (January 17, 1904 – October 7, 1972) was an American football and baseball player and coach. He was the first Tulane football player selected first-team All-American. In 1925, he led the nation in scoring with 128 points, a school record not broken until 2007 by Matt Forte.

Early years
Flournoy attended high school at the Rugby Academy.

Playing career
He played college football at the halfback position for the Tulane Green Wave football team from 1923 to 1925. He stood 6 feet, 1 inch, weighed 165 pounds, and wore number 15. As a senior in 1925, Flournoy led Tulane to an undefeated season and led the nation in scoring with 128 points. At the end of the 1925 season, he was selected by Billy Evans and Norman E. Brown as a first-team halfback on their 1925 College Football All-America Teams. He was also named a second-team All-American by the Associated Press and the All-America Board.  He was inducted into the Louisiana Sports Hall of Fame in 1968. He died in New Orleans in 1972.

One account reads "In the South they call "Peggy" Flournoy of Tulane University, the greatest all-round gridder in that section."

Coaching career
Flournoy assisted his alma mater's football team in 1926, and was the baseball coach in 1928.

See also
 List of NCAA major college football yearly scoring leaders

References

1904 births
1972 deaths
American football halfbacks
Tulane Green Wave baseball coaches
Tulane Green Wave baseball players
Tulane Green Wave football coaches
Tulane Green Wave football players
All-American college football players
All-Southern college football players
People from Canton, Mississippi
Players of American football from Mississippi